The 2016 Red Bull Air Race World Championship was the eleventh Red Bull Air Race World Championship series.

Aircraft and pilots

Master Class

Pilot changes
 Reigning champion Paul Bonhomme and inaugural champion Péter Besenyei retired from the sport following the final round of the 2015 season.
 Petr Kopfstein and Peter Podlunšek made their debuts in the Master Class, having finished equal 1st and 5th respectively in the previous years' Challenger Class standings.

Mid-season changes
 Cristian Bolton stepped up to the Master Class following the death of Hannes Arch before the Indianapolis round of the series.

Challenger Class
 All Challenger Cup Pilots used an Extra 330LX.

Pilot changes
 Mélanie Astles, Kevin Coleman, Luke Czepiela and Ben Murphy will make their debuts in the Challenger Class. Astles will become the first female pilot to compete in a Red Bull Air Race event.

Race calendar and results
The eight-event calendar for the 2016 season was announced on 16 December 2015.

Championship standings

Master Class
Master Class scoring system

* Arch finished 4th but was later excluded from the results; thus the points for 4th place were not awarded to any pilot.
** The final four wasn't held because of bad weather, 75% of points were awarded for this situation.

Challenger Class
Challenger Class scoring system

References

External links

 

 
Red Bull Air Race World Championship seasons
Red Bull Air Race
Red Bull Air Race